Synanthedon codeti is a moth of the family Sesiidae. It is found in France, Spain, Portugal and on Sardinia. It is also found in North Africa, from Morocco to Algeria and Tunisia.

The wingspan is 18–20 mm.

The larvae feed on Quercus, Castanea sativa, Juglans regia, Corylus avellana, Fagus sylvatica, Platanus orientalis, Malus, Prunus, Carya pecan and Carya olivaeformis.

References

Moths described in 1881
Sesiidae
Moths of Europe